Kal Kash (also romanized as Kāl Kash, Kālkash, Kalkesh, Kāl Kesh, and Kal Kosh; also known as Kalkosh Kāseh and Kal Kūsh) is a village in Heydariyeh Rural District, Govar District, Gilan-e Gharb County, Kermanshah Province, Iran. At the 2006 census, its population was 1,864, in 417 families.

References 

Populated places in Gilan-e Gharb County